Cláudio da Matta Freire (born 17 April 1957) is a Brazilian athlete. He competed in the men's high jump at the 1980 Summer Olympics.

References

1957 births
Living people
Athletes (track and field) at the 1980 Summer Olympics
Brazilian male high jumpers
Olympic athletes of Brazil
Place of birth missing (living people)